The Cook Islands compete as a part of netball's Oceania region. More than 1,000 players have registered to play the sport. Participation in the game grew during the 1970s. Much of this is possible because of the national governing organisation, the Cook Islands Netball Association which is a member of Oceania Netball Federation. Because of the level of organisation and the game's development, the country has participated at several international events including the Pacific Games, the Commonwealth Games, the World Games, the Oceania Netball Tournament, the World Youth Netball Championship, and the International Challenge Men's and Mixed Netball Tournament. A demonstration of the Cook Islands success can be found by looking at the national team: It is one of the top ranked in the world.

Netball has grass roots support and plays an important part in the life of women on the islands. There are over 15 netball clubs. Beyond club competitions, the game is played at schools and at national festivals like the Manea Games.  The game's reach extends beyond traditional gender boundaries and is also being played by some Cook Islander men. Netball has benefited from several high visibility players and administrators, who have helped to develop the game internally and internationally.

About the Cook Islands

The Cook Islands are an island nation, with a population of 23,400 people as of September 2010. As of 2006, there were 15,324 total residents of the Cook Islands.  Of these, 7,822 were male and 7,502 were female. The most populated islands and regions were Raratonga with 10,226 residents of which 5,008 were female, Aitutaki with 1,975 total residents of whom 989 were female, Mangaia with 631 total residents of which 324 were female, Atiu with 558 residents of which 275 were female, Pukapuka with 419 total residents of whom 184 were female, Mauke with 372 total residents of which 178 were female, and Manihiki with 344 total residents of which 153 are female.

Netball history and development
Because of a favourable climate, sport is played year round in the Cook Islands.  Most sports, including netball, cricket, tennis, boxing, golf, soccer, squash and rugby union, are of European origin. The most developed and popular of them is netball, a sport in which the Cook Islands has participated on a global stage. The two most important international sport competitions that the Cook Islands participate in are the Commonwealth Games and the South Pacific Games. The Cook Islands was a major force behind the creation of the South Pacific Mini Games, participation in which has played an important role in the country's modern sporting history. Since the 1970s, the popularity of netball on the islands grew and the Cook Islands has made an effort to host these events as a way to improve facilities. During the 1970s, the Cook Islands began bidding to host international sporting events. Meanwhile, the popularity of netball grew. The sport's popularity is partly due to the influence of New Zealand, where Cook Island players have competed for New Zealand's national team. One such player was Margharet Matenga, who joined the Silver Ferns in 1979. Another was Anna Noovao, who was the captain of the New Zealand side in 1992. New Zealand encouraged the sport in the Cook Islands during the 1980s by hosting coaching and umpiring clinics. There are a number of athletes from the Cook Islands who reside overseas. This is especially true of netball. Some commentators state that living abroad has provided these athletes with access to facilities and levels of higher competition that they cannot get at home.

In 1991, the Government of the Cook Islands identified the lack of funding for sport facilities as a key reason why the nation has not succeeded at international competitions. It believed that investing in sporting infrastructure would enable the nation to be more globally competitive. Netball was not recognised as an Olympic sport until 1995. While official recognition as an Olympic sport did not mean that it was played at the Olympics, it did mean that the national association and the Cook Islands government could then access Olympic funding to help cover costs for facilities, travel, coaching, umpire training and other grass roots development efforts. The Cook Islands Netball Association is the governing body for the sport in the Cook Islands, and historically, the sport has been administered by women. Most netball courts are owned by the local village or club. With the exception of National Auditorium, all courts are outside. In 1990, the Cook Islands Netball Association had 15 clubs affiliated with it, all based in the southern islands group, including Ngatangia/Matavera, Avatiu/Nikao, Arorangi, Titikaveka, Takuvaine, Tupapa, Outer Islands.

The South Pacific Mini Games is a sporting event televised by a local Cook Islands television station. Sports contested at the games included netball. These games were televised, with funding to buy the rights being provided by the West German Government and the Government of the Cook Islands. In 2008, the first live broadcast of a netball game happened on television in the Cook Islands when the Silver Ferns played the Aussie Diamonds on 29 September.

The Manea Games are an annual eleven-day sport festival. The fifth version of the festival was held in 2008 at Aitutaki. The 2011 edition of the games were held in Mangaia. Sports represented at the games include netball, athletics, cricket, darts, soccer, rugby sevens, table tennis, tennis, touch rugby, volleyball and traditional games. The games are taken very seriously across all sports.  Girls competing at netball compete with the hope of one day competing at the international level.

In 1992, the government detailed its national sport objectives. These objectives included promoting youth activity in order to improve quality of life, encourage young people to participate in national celebrations, develop and organize local sport, and foster a sense of competition and national unity in the sporting community across the village, national and international sphere. While not specifically mentioning netball, it did acknowledge the importance of the sport in terms of international prestige. One of the strategies to help meet those objectives was to strengthen national sporting bodies like the netball association. This worked; by 2009, there were more than 1,000 players registered with the Cook Islands Netball Association.

Grass roots netball
There are at least three netball courts on the island of Atiu, which has a population of around 650. The netball and tennis rivalries between villagers on the island is fierce, and they built the netball facilities to help them win. The island has nine tennis courts, which used more often for playing netball, volleyball and soccer than tennis. There are a number of netball teams affiliated with schools on Atiu. Each has its own colours: Teenui wears blue on top and white on the bottom;Tengatangi and Mapumai wears green on top and white on the bottom; Ngatirua wears black on top and bottom; and Areora wears red on top and white on the bottom.  The Girls' Brigade, Girl Guides and Junior Missionary Volunteers also have their own uniforms and colours.

Netball is played on the island of Aitutaki. Other sports played on the island include rugby union, rugby sevens, association football, cricket, volleyball, darts, tennis, badminton, ping pong and athletics.

Netball plays an important role on the social life of Cook Island women. For their social activities, rather than go to bars, they play netball and go to church. Netball games are most often played on Saturdays during the winter months from April to August, though games can be played throughout the year. Female players who make the national team are treated like minor celebrities.

Traditionally, on village feast days, several sport competitions are held including netball, rugby and dance.

The Cook Islands Golden Oldies Netball Association is a local league that is part of a network of leagues in various sports aimed at seniors. Belonging to these teams offers seniors a chance to travel that they might not be able to afford otherwise because of the high cost of transportation from the Cook Islands to other locations.

Men's netball
Unlike some countries, the growth of men's netball is hampered by cultural bias against it; when parents see their boys playing it, they actively discourage them from continuing. Despite this, the Cook Islands also has a men's national team that has competed in the 2006, 2009 and 2011 International Challenge Men's and Mixed Netball Tournament. The popularity of netball is growing amongst men on the island, as sport is an important way of villages keeping in touch with each other.

At the Easter sports day, organised by the Christian Youth Organization, traditional roles are exchanged and boys play netball while girls play rugby. During this sporting event, the boys cross dress and wear the uniforms that are traditionally worn by women.

People
Many people have been important in the push to develop the game in the Cook Islands and raise the profile of the national netball team on the global stage. They include Anna Noovao, who was the captain of the 1992 New Zealand side, Margharet Matenga, who was the first Cook Islands player to play for New Zealand's national team, and Mamia, who was the secretary of the Cook Islands Netball Association for six years. Mamia was an umpire and an umpire examiner for the Oceania region. She attended South Pacific Games in Micronesia, the Commonwealth Games in Malaysia, and the Olympic Games in Sydney. Mamia was a national representative for teams that had competed in the South Pacific Games during the 1980s. Tina Browne was president of the Cook Islands Netball Association. Elizabeth Tou was coach of the national team from 2005 to 2007. She represented the country as a player at Pacific Games, Commonwealth Games and the World Championships.

International

The Cook Islands Netball Association is a member of the Oceania Netball Federation. The nation's participation in the international netball community has raised the islands' visibility globally. The Cook Islands won the netball competition at the first South Pacific Games, now Pacific Games, held in 1981. The national team had its first win in the tournament in 1983, when it beat Fiji. In 1986, the government provided 
to help the team travel to the 1986 Commonwealth Games in Scotland. The 1987 Netball World Championships were also held in Scotland, and the Cook Islands team came in sixth. At the World Games 1989 in Germany, the team came fourth. In the 1990 Oceania Netball Tournament, the team defeated New Zealand, Tonga and Fiji to come in second behind Australia. In January 2011, the national team was ranked eleventh in the world.

At the 1992 World Youth Cup in Samoa, the Cook Islands U-21 team defeated several high-profile international teams including Wales, Samoa, and England. The Cook Islands' defeat of Canada, 114–13, in that tournament was a record for the highest score in the tournament. The Cook Islands also has a national team that competes in the international Golden Oldies netball tournament. In 2004, a team from the Cook Islands competed in the International Schoolgirls Netball Challenge. The country hosted the 2008 World Youth Championship, and the 2009 International Challenge Men's and Mixed Netball Tournament. In 2011, a New Zealander, Margaret Foster, was appointed as head coach of the development squad. One of her goals was to improve the team's fitness levels.

In the lead up to the 2009 World Youth Championship, there was considerable anxiety over the facilities, and whether they would be up to world standards. The Prime Minister of the Cook Islands reconfirmed that his government would deliver a new venue. Because of this, the International Netball Federation reaffirmed their support for hosting the event in the Cook Islands. The Chinese government offered to step in and loan the country   to help pay the costs for constructing the facility. The loan was controversial as some organisations felt the country had misplaced priorities. The opposition leader Norman George was unhappy with how the government handled the whole situation regarding new sporting facilities to be built for the World Youth Netball Championships and the 2009 Pacific Mini Games.

Competitive history
The table below contains a sample of the Cook Islands results in international competitions.

The table below contains sample of Cook Islands results in individual international matches.

References

Notes

Bibliography

External links
 Cook Islands Netball Association
 Cook Islands Sports and National Olympic Committee
 Oceania Sport